Adiantum jordanii is a perennial species of maidenhair fern, in the Vittarioideae subfamily of the Pteridaceae. The species is known by the common name California maidenhair.

It is native to California and Baja California. A. jordanii is found in the southernmost part of its range in Baja California with such flora associates as Mimulus aridus and Daucus pusillus.

Each trailing leaf may reach over half a meter in length and is made up of many rounded green segments. Each segment has two to four lobes and it may split between the lobes, the underside of each segment bearing one to four sori.

Adiantum jordanii is a carrier of the fungus-like oomycete, Phytophthora ramorum, which causes Sudden Oak Death. The USDA enforces an import control, focusing intensely on areas (CA, OR, NY in U.S.) that are infected with Sudden Oak death.  When sold, they must be identified by place of origin and must also be accompanied by a phytosanitary certificate. The USDA warns to not take cuttings from wild specimens.

Adiantum jordanii, from native plant nurseries, is used in native plant and wildlife gardens.

References

Further reading
 C. Michael Hogan. 2008. Coastal Woodfern (Dryopteris arguta), GlobalTwitcher, ed. N. Stromberg
 Jepson Manual. 1993. Adiantum jordanii, University of California, Berkeley
 U.S. Department of Agriculture. 2009. USDA Plants Profile: Adiantum jordanii
 U.S.D.A. Import Control Notice. Import prohibited plants and areas related to sudden oak death

External links
Photo gallery

jordanii
Ferns of California
Flora of Oregon
Garden plants of North America
Ferns of the United States
Plants described in 1864